The 2011 New Year Honours in New Zealand were appointments by Elizabeth II in her right as Queen of New Zealand, on the advice of the New Zealand government, to various orders and honours to reward and highlight good works by New Zealanders, and to celebrate the passing of 2010 and the beginning of 2011. They were announced on 31 December 2010.

The recipients of honours are displayed here as they were styled before their new honour.

Order of New Zealand (ONZ)
Ordinary member
 Sir Robert James Charles  – of Oxford. For services to New Zealand.

New Zealand Order of Merit

Knight Grand Companion (GNZM)
 Raymond John Avery – of Auckland. For services to philanthropy.

Dame Companion (DNZM)
 Alison Margaret Holst   – of Auckland. For services to the food industry.

Knight Companion (KNZM)
 The Honourable William David Baragwanath – of Wellington. For services as a judge of the Court of Appeal.
 William Murray Gallagher  – of Hamilton. For services to business.
 Richard Michael Hill  – of Arrowtown. For services to business and the arts.
 James Henry Peter McNeish – of Wellington. For services to literature.
 Emeritus Professor Tamati Muturangi Reedy – of Wellington. For services to education.

Companion (CNZM)
 Peter George Bush  – of Wellington. For services to photography.
 Janet Mary Clews  – of Auckland. For services to local-body affairs and the community.
 Letitia June Clifford  – of Napier. For services to music and the community.
 Yvette Winifred Corlett  – of Auckland. For services to athletics.
 Miriam Rose Dean  – of Auckland. For services to the law and business.
 Christine Mary Fernyhough  – of Castle Hill. For services to the community.
 David John Hay  – of Auckland. For services to local-body affairs and the community.
 Ricki Lloyd Herbert – of Wellington. For services to football.
 Professor Emeritus Roy Patrick Kerr – of Christchurch. For services to astrophysics.
 Johannes La Grouw – of Rotorua. For services to business and the community.
 Dr Semisi Ma'ia'i  – of Wellington. For services to the Samoan community.
 Murray Allan Sherwin – of Wellington. For services as chief executive of the Ministry of Agriculture and Forestry.
 Professor Ian James Warrington – of Palmerston North. For services to science.

Officer (ONZM)
 Derek Andrew Anderson – of Christchurch. For services to the community.
 Michael Francis Barnett – of Auckland. For services to business.
 Dr Warren Johnston Bell – of Auckland. For services to forensic science.
 Nicolas Calavrias – of Wellington. For services to business.
 Andrew Forbes Davidson – of Christchurch. For services to the timber industry.
 Dr Barbara Lynn Disley – of Auckland. For services to health.
 Peter James Egan – of Hamilton. For services to the meat industry.
 Brian Francis Evans – of Auckland. For services to women's rugby.
 Professor Lewis Tudor Evans – of Porirua. For services to education.
 Rangimarie Naida Glavish  – of Auckland. For services to Māori and the community.
 Thomas David Henshaw – of Hamilton. For services as a cartoonist.
 John William Holdsworth – of Wellington. For services to business and the community.
 Paul Anthony Honiss – of Hamilton. For services to the community.
 Phillip John Leishman – of Auckland. For services to media and the community.
 Richard Arthur Long – of Wellington. For services to journalism.
 David William Mace – of Auckland. For services to the community.
 Dr Keith Ian Desmond Maslen – of Dunedin. For services to literature and bibliography.
 Professor Lesley Margaret Elizabeth McCowan – of Auckland. For services to health.
 Professor Samuel Stuart McNaughton – of Auckland. For services to education.
 Ryan Nelsen – of Cheshire, United Kingdom . For services to football.
 Associate Professor John Andrew Ormiston – of Auckland. For services to medicine.
 Vicki Suzanne Reid – of Nelson. For services to the community.
 Jeanette Robyn Richardson – of Opua. For services to the community.
 The Honourable Roger Morrison Sowry – of Paraparaumu. For services as a Member of Parliament.
 William Paul Studholme  – of Banks Peninsula. For services to forestry and the community.
 Associate Professor Jean-Claude Theis – of Dunedin. For services to medicine.

Member (MNZM)
 Robert Harold Briant – of Gisborne. For services to the community.
 Alison Ann Broad  – of Invercargill. For services to the community.
 Lindsay John Brown – of Dunedin. For services to the community.
 Jens Bukholt  – of Wanganui. For services to the community.
 Karen Margrethe Bukholt  – of Wanganui. For services to the community.
 Elisabeth Phyllis June Burgess – of Auckland. For services to women's health.
 James John Campbell – of Auckland. For services to surf life saving.
 Bernard Albert Roy Card – of Porirua. For services to agriculture.
 Dr John Manley Carter – of Wellington. For services to medicine.
 Marion Dorothy Cooper  – of Lower Hutt. For services to Te Omanga Hospice.
 Dr Edward John Gane – of Auckland. For services to medicine.
 Garth Edward George – of Rotorua. For services to journalism.
 Maurice Giovanni Gianotti – of Taupō. For services to education and the community.
 William Frank Guest – of Wellington. For services to the performing arts.
 Ewa Katete Haua – of Auckland. For services to Māori.
 Thomas William Johnson – of Napier. For services to rugby.
 Alexa Mary Johnston – of Auckland. For services to the arts.
 Lorraine Kerr – of Tūrangi. For services to education.
 Shelley Celia Kitchen – of Auckland. For services to sport.
 Connie Fay Ling Kum – of Auckland. For services to the Chinese community.
 Scott Laurenson – of Paraparaumu. For services to wrestling.
 Anthony George Lewis – of Christchurch. For services to music.
 John Roderick McKenzie – of Christchurch. For services to agriculture.
 Kitty-Anne Joy McKinley – of Wellington. For services to youth and the community.
 David Wyndham Meares – of Greta Valley. For services to agriculture.
 Wayne Fortune Mills – of Auckland. For services to education.
 Richard John Nanson – of Wellington. For services to horticulture.
 Robert Arthur Neale – of Palmerston North. For services to education and the community.
 Donald Owen Neely  – of Wellington. For services to cricket.
 Fiona Campbell Pearson – of Wellington. For services to the Cancer Society.
 Garry Alan Pedersen – of Auckland. For services to motorsport.
 Steven John Price – of Auckland. For services to rugby league.
 Shaun Cameron Quincey – of Auckland. For services to solo long-distance rowing.
 Roger Girling Rose  – of Blenheim. For services to the community.
 Melissa Jane Ruscoe – of Christchurch. For services to women's rugby.
 Colin Francis Smith – of Gore. For services to business.
 Brendan Michael Smyth – of Wellington. For services to the music industry.
 Neil William Sole  – of Katikati. For services to the community.
 John Ernest Edward Southerwood – of Napier. For services to Māori.
 Graham Charles Stewart – of Wellington. For services to historical research and photography.
 John Benjamin Sutherland  – of Christchurch. For services to philanthropy.
 Roy Bruce Tankersley – of Palmerston North. For services to music.
 Dr Rex William Thomson – of Dunedin. For services to education and sport.
 Haidee Maree Tiffen – of Christchurch. For services to women's cricket.
 Errol Brian Velvin – of New Plymouth. For services to surf life saving.
 James Terence Wakelin – of Auckland. For services to surf life saving.
 Muriel Pimia Wehi  – of Auckland. For services to Māori.
 Kok Kit Wong – of Auckland. For services to business and the community.
 John Liddell Wylie – of Christchurch. For services to rowing.

Companion of the Queen's Service Order (QSO)
 Jennifer Sylvia Brash – of Porirua. For services to local-body affairs.
 Clive Raymond Geddes – of Queenstown. For services to local-body affairs.
 The Honourable Winifred Alexandra Laban (Luamanuvao Laban) – of Porirua. For services as a Member of Parliament.
 Robert Bruce Pulman  – of Auckland. For services to the community.
 Maureen Ellen Reynolds – of Dannevirke. For services to local-body affairs.
 Betty Leuina Sio – of Auckland. For services to the Pacific Island community.
 Peter David Tennent – of New Plymouth. For services to local-body affairs.
 Dr Joseph Williams  – of Auckland. For services to the Cook Islands community.

Queen's Service Medal (QSM)
 Robert Shelley Abbott – of Christchurch. For services to the hearing impaired.
 Lois Ann Aitkenhead – of Nelson. For services to the community.
 John Neville Anderson – of Rangiora. For services to the New Zealand Customs Service.
 Lorna Anne Anderson – of Otautau. For services to the community.
 Margaret Joan Arnold – of Christchurch. For services to women and the community.
 Thevarajan Arumugam – of Auckland. For services to the Tamil community.
 Alan Francis Atkinson – of Greymouth. For services to children.
 David Bolam-Smith – of Christchurch. For services to the community.
 George Anthony Borthwick – of Wellington. For services to The Salvation Army.
 Stewart Bowden  – of Whangārei. For services to the community.
 Vivien Mary Broughton – of Blenheim. For services to the community.
 Alexander Brian Calder – of Ruakākā. For services to the New Zealand Fire Service.
 Heugh Henry Noel Chappell – of Havelock North. For services to broadcasting and the community.
 Fay Patricia Colthurst  – of Whangārei. For services to the community.
 Rex Peter Andrea Da Vanzo – of Wellington. For services to the community.
 Murray Bentham Daniels – of Christchurch. For services to marine conservation.
 Chief Fire Officer David John Edhouse  – of Ōwhango. For services to the New Zealand Fire Service.
 Su'a Saimolialevalasi Margueritta Ekepati-Leilua – of Auckland. For services to the Pacific Island community.
 Peter Donaldson Ellery – of Palmerston North. For services to brass bands.
 Barry Peter Finch  – of New Plymouth. For services to the community.
 Foai Suka Foai – of Auckland. For services to the Tokelauan community.
 David Walker Frew – of Riverton. For services to the community.
 Inspector David Hugh Gaskin – of Timaru. For services to the New Zealand Police.
 Rahera Whareti Gibson – of Tolaga Bay. For services to Māori.
 Kevin Gordon Greer – of Palmerston North. For services to the community.
 Colin Donald Gunn – of Nelson. For services to the community.
 Murray Kenneth Marshall Hansen  – of Kawerau. For services to the community.
 Penelope Jane Hansen  – of Auckland. For services to literature and the community.
 Annette Mary Harris  – of Christchurch. For services to the community.
 Gavin Neil Henderson – of Christchurch. For services to the community.
 Lesley Margaret Jackson – of Hokitika. For services to music and the community.
 David Gareth James – of Auckland. For services to education.
 Joan Grace Kehely  – of Tauranga. For services to local-body affairs.
 Bernard Seth Kingsbury  – of Cust. For services to the New Zealand Fire Service.
 Sally McFarlane Macdonald – of Te Anau. For services to the community.
 Ivan Beaumont Mandahl – of Feilding. For services to the community.
 John Douglas McClelland – of Lower Hutt. For services to the New Zealand Police.
 John Desmond Miller – of Gore. For services to the community.
 William Ross Morgan  – of Cambridge. For services to the community.
 Elsie Gertrude Morriss – of Ashburton. For services to the arts.
 Elspeth Eleanor Mount – of Auckland. For services to the community.
 Ataraita Adelaide Ngatai  – of Tauranga. For services to Māori.
 Enoka Ngatai – of Tauranga. For services to Māori.
 Harshadrai Khapabhai Patel – of Auckland. For services to the Indian community.
 John Frederick Pettit – of Auckland. For services to the community.
 Rosemary Ruth Reid – of Alexandra. For services to music.
 John Douglas Rhind – of Christchurch. For services as a funeral director.
 Inspector Kevin John Riordan – of Wellington. For services to the New Zealand Police.
 Gurmeeta Singh  – of Auckland. For services to the community.
 Peter Ben Snow – of Upper Hutt. For services to the community.
 Charles Richard Stewart – of Timaru. For services to youth.
 Judith Raylene Stewart – of Timaru. For services to youth.
 Sergeant Marie Theresa Stratford – of Auckland. For services to the New Zealand Police.
 Niu Sila Mataio Taupe – of Porirua. For services to the Tokelauan community.
 Kororia Tangihaere Theodore – of Auckland. For services to the community.
 William John Vaile – of Westport. For services to the community.
 Ngapo Wehi  – of Auckland. For services to Māori.
 Jillian Mary Wychel – of Auckland. For services to education.

New Zealand Distinguished Service Decoration (DSD)
 Captain Suzanne Lynn Koia – Royal New Zealand Nursing Corps.
 Warrant Officer Donald Napier – Royal New Zealand Air Force.

References

New Year Honours
2011 awards
2011 in New Zealand
New Zealand awards